Leandro Gareca Cardona (born 23 June 1991) is a Bolivian footballer who currently plays for Universitario de Sucre.

Club career
Gareca began his career on Universitario de Sucre, but appeared only in the bench, on 28 November 2010, against Real Mamoré.

In February of the following year, the Brazilian side Figueirense brought Gareca in a one-year loan. However, the player was not registered, and failed to make a single appearance for Figueira.

In January 2012 Gareca moved to Paraguay, and signed a contract with Independiente Campo Grande.

References

External links
 
 

1991 births
Living people
People from Hernando Siles Province
Association football fullbacks
Bolivian footballers
Universitario de Sucre footballers
Figueirense FC players
Independiente F.B.C. footballers
Bolivian expatriate footballers
Expatriate footballers in Brazil
Expatriate footballers in Paraguay